Robert Scanlan may refer to:

 Robert H. Scanlan (1914–2001), civil and aeronautical engineer
 Robert Richard Scanlan (1801–1876), Irish painter and portraitist
 Bob Scanlan (born 1966), baseball player